Sir John Betjeman (1906–1984) was a twentieth-century English poet, writer and broadcaster. Born to a middle-class family in Edwardian Hampstead, he attended Oxford University, although left without graduating. He turned down a position in the family furniture business, and instead took a series of jobs before becoming the assistant editor of The Architectural Review in 1931, which reflected a deeply held affection for buildings and their history. That same year he published his first book, Mount Zion, a collection of poems.

In 1932 Betjeman began a career in broadcasting, with a radio programme about the proposed destruction of Waterloo Bridge; he continued with regular radio work for the rest of his life, appearing in a wide range of genres, from panel and game shows, interviews, news interviews, documentaries and poetry readings. He published his first non-verse book in 1933, Ghastly Good Taste, which was subtitled "a Depressing Story of the Rise and Fall of English Architecture"; it reflected his concern of the destruction of Victorian and Edwardian architecture to make way for "grimmer contemporary developments, shopping arcades, and bogus Tudor bars". In 1937—shortly after the BBC began regular screen broadcasts—he appeared in his first television programme, How to Make a Guidebook, and went on to appear in a wide range of programmes until his death. His television appearances increased from the 1950s, and his output was prolific.

In 1960 Betjeman was appointed a Commander of the Most Excellent Order of the British Empire (CBE), which was followed in 1968 with his election as a Companion of Literature. In 1969 he was knighted and, in 1972, he succeeded Cecil Day-Lewis as Britain's Poet Laureate. In the later years of his life, Betjeman suffered from Parkinson's disease, and he died in May 1984. His obituarist in The Times thought him "a true original", and considered that he was "whimsical, imprudent, shrewd, humorous, disarming, always something of an enfant terrible". The poet Philip Larkin wrote that Betjeman "was not only the best loved poet, but one of the best loved men of our time", while his biographer, the academic John Clarke, described him as a "unique figure in twentieth-century English poetry, enjoying a degree of fame and success unequalled by any poet since Byron".

Verse

Radio

Betjeman was broadcast in numerous radio performances, although no full record exists. Most were on British radio, although he also made recordings for American radio.

Books

Editor

Betjeman undertook the role of editor for several magazines and journals, including the undergraduate magazines of Oxford Outlook and Cherwell; the following consists of the books he edited.

Television

Discography

Notes and references

Notes

References

Sources

  
 
 
 
 
 
 
 
 
 

Bibliographies by writer
Bibliographies of British writers
Poetry bibliographies